Schirmer's test determines whether the eye produces enough tears to keep it moist. This test is used when a person experiences very dry eyes or excessive watering of the eyes. It can cause damage to the cornea. A negative (more than 10 mm of moisture on the filter paper in 5 minutes) test result is normal. Both eyes normally secrete the same amount of tears.

It is named for Otto Schirmer.

Test procedure

The test works by the principle of capillary action, which allows the water in tears to travel along the length of a paper test strip in an identical fashion as a horizontal capillary tube. The rate of travel along the test strip is proportional to the rate of tear production. The patient is instructed to look upward, and the patient’s eyelid is pulled down. The bent end of the test strip is placed in the eye such that it rests between the palpebral conjunctiva of the lower eyelid and the bulbar conjunctiva of the eye.
Schirmer's test uses paper strips inserted into the eye for several minutes to measure the production of tears. Both eyes are tested at the same time. Most often, this test consists of placing a small strip of filter paper inside the lower eyelid (inferior fornix). The eyes are closed for 5 minutes. The paper is then removed and the amount of moisture is measured. After five minutes, the patient is asked to open both eyes and look upward so the test strips may be removed. The Schirmer test score is determined by the length of the moistened area of the strips (using the scale packaged with the strips)  The use of the anesthetic ensures that only basal tear secretion is being measured.

A young person normally moistens 15 mm of each paper strip.  Because hypolacrimation occurs with aging, 33% of normal elderly persons may wet only 10 mm in 5 minutes.  Persons with Sjögren's syndrome moisten less than 5 mm in 5 minutes.

How to read results of the Schirmer's test:
1. Normal which is ≥10 mm wetting of the paper after 5 minutes.
2. Tear deficiency which is <5 mm wetting of the paper after 5 minutes.

Alternatives
Even though this test has been available for over a century, several clinical studies have shown that it does not properly identify a large group of patients with dry eyes. Newer and better tests of tear production and function are now emerging.
 One test measures an iron-binding molecule called lactoferrin. The amount of this molecule appears to be closely related to tear production. Patients with low tear production and dry eyes have low levels of this molecule. This test may be especially valuable for patients with dry eyes since it can point to specific treatment strategies for dry eye.
 The tears may also be examined for their content of lysozyme, an enzyme normally found in tears.
 Another test involves fluorescein eye drops, which contain a dye that is placed in the eye. The dye should drain with the tears through the lacrimal duct into the nose within 2 minutes. If patients do not have enough tears to flush the dye into the nose, this time will be longer. A new test is also available to more accurately measure the flow of dye out of the eye.

Eye dryness
Dry eyes can occur from conditions such as:
 Aging
 Arthritis
 Corneal ulcers and infections
 Diabetes
 Eye infections (for example conjunctivitis)
 Secondary tearing deficiency associated with disorders such as – lymphoma, leukemia, GVHD (graft vs. host disease, after a transplant)
 Sjögren's syndrome
 Triple A syndrome
 Vitamin A deficiency
 As a temporary or permanent side effect of LASER vision correction surgery such as LASIK or photorefractive keratectomy (PRK)

The inability of tears to drain into the nose can occur with:
 Some eye infections
 Blockage of the tear duct

See also
 Dry eye syndrome
 Tear break-up time

References

External links
 
 Photo
 Diagram

Diagnostic ophthalmology
Veterinary diagnosis